Huckleberry Hall is a historic farm complex located at Leitersburg, Washington County, Maryland, United States.  The complex includes a -story Germanic stone house built about 1784, an 18th-century stone blacksmith shop, a frame bank barn, a mid-19th-century brick secondary dwelling, and other agricultural outbuildings.

Huckleberry Hall was listed on the National Register of Historic Places in 1990.

References

External links
, including photo from 1990, at Maryland Historical Trust

Farms on the National Register of Historic Places in Maryland
Houses in Washington County, Maryland
Houses completed in 1784
National Register of Historic Places in Washington County, Maryland
Pennsylvania Dutch culture in Maryland